Bernard Rollen Williams III (born January 19, 1978) is an American male former track and field sprinter and winner of a gold medal in 4 × 100-meter relay at the 2000 Summer Olympics. He was the 200-meter dash silver medalist at the 2004 Summer Olympics and the 100-meter dash silver medalist at the 2001 World Championships in Athletics. He also won relay gold at the 2003 World Championships in Athletics and was the 100 m gold medalist at the 1999 Pan American Games.

He has broken the 10-second barrier and holds a personal record of 9.94 seconds in the 100 m. Williams was the fastest man in the 200 m at the 2003 season with a personal record of 20.01 seconds. He won the American national title in the 100 m at the USA Outdoor Track and Field Championships in 2001 and 2003. He competed collegiately for the Florida Gators and was NCAA Outdoor champion in the 100 m and 4 × 100 m relay in 2000.

Biography
Born in Baltimore, Maryland, Bernard Williams won the 100 meters at the 1999 Pan American Games.

Williams accepted an athletic scholarship to attend the University of Florida in Gainesville, Florida, where he was a member of the Florida Gators track and field team. He graduated from the university with a bachelor's degree in sociology in 2008.

In 2000, Williams won the NCAA Championships in the 100 meters and 4 × 100 m relay as a Florida Gator sprinter. He ran the second leg on the gold medal-winning American 4 × 100 m relay  team at the 2000 Summer Olympics in Sydney. The teams extravagant celebrations drew criticism at the time. Acquiring the nickname "Hollywood", he was personally noted for his comedy antics during the 2000 Olympics, including using "the people's eyebrow" – a pose used by then-professional wrestler Dwayne "The Rock" Johnson. Also, known for his pre race antics and poses playing to any crowd, which grew to be increasingly accepted in the sport following the celebrations of multiple Olympic champion Usain Bolt.

At the 2001 World Championships, Williams finished third but was given the Silver medal for the 100 meters when (Tim Montgomery) was discovered to have used steroids.  Williams also ran the second leg on the American 4 × 100 m relay team, which won the gold medal. The team's gold medals were withdrawn when Tim Montgomery was discovered to have used steroids. Williams was upgraded to 100 m national champion as a result of this disqualification, however.

In 2003, Williams won the US National Championships in 100 meters and was fifth in 100 meters at the 2003 World Championships. He was also a member of gold medal-winning American relay team. He tested positive for cannabis and received a warning from the USADA in August 2004, but was still able to compete in the Olympics in accordance with IAAF rules.

At the 2004 Summer Olympics, Williams won the silver medal in 200 meters, edging compatriot and 100 meters champion Justin Gatlin in the final few meters. Thus, Americans won all three top places, since Shawn Crawford won the gold. The Americans performed to a booing audience, as the Greeks protested the exclusion of the 2000 Olympic champion Kostas Kenteris for doping.

Bernard works as a Sports Performance Coach in the Maryland, Washington D.C, and Virginia area.

Personal bests

International competitions

National titles
USA Outdoor Track and Field Championships
100 m: 2001, 2003
NCAA Men's Outdoor Track and Field Championships
100 m: 2000
4 × 100 m relay: 2000

See also

List of Olympic medalists in athletics (men)
List of men's Olympic and World Championship athletics sprint champions
List of medal sweeps in Olympic athletics
List of Pan American Games medalists in athletics (men)
List of 2000 Summer Olympics medal winners
List of 2004 Summer Olympics medal winners
200 metres at the Olympics
4 × 100 metres relay at the Olympics
100 metres at the World Championships in Athletics
4 × 100 metres relay at the World Championships in Athletics
List of 100 metres national champions (men)
List of University of Florida alumni
List of University of Florida Olympians
List of doping cases in athletics
List of athletes from Maryland N – Z
List of people from Gainesville, Florida
List of people with surname Williams

References

External links
USATF profile

1978 births
Living people
Track and field athletes from Baltimore
American male sprinters
Olympic male sprinters
Olympic gold medalists for the United States in track and field
Olympic silver medalists for the United States in track and field
Athletes (track and field) at the 2000 Summer Olympics
Athletes (track and field) at the 2004 Summer Olympics
Medalists at the 2000 Summer Olympics
Medalists at the 2004 Summer Olympics
Pan American Games track and field athletes for the United States
Pan American Games gold medalists for the United States
Pan American Games medalists in athletics (track and field)
Athletes (track and field) at the 1999 Pan American Games
World Athletics Championships athletes for the United States
World Athletics Championships medalists
Florida Gators men's track and field athletes
African-American male track and field athletes
American sportspeople in doping cases
Doping cases in athletics
USA Outdoor Track and Field Championships winners
World Athletics Championships winners
Medalists at the 1999 Pan American Games
21st-century African-American sportspeople
20th-century African-American sportspeople